Nikola Koljević (Serbian Cyrillic: Никола Кољевић; 9 June 1936 – 25 January 1997) was a Serbian politician, university professor, translator and an essayist, one of the foremost Yugoslavian Shakespeare scholars. In 2016, he was posthumously declared by the United Nations to be part of a criminal enterprise with extreme views toward Muslims.

Koljević served as the Serb Member of the Presidency of Bosnia and Herzegovina alongside Biljana Plavšić and was the Vice President of Republika Srpska during the Bosnian War.

Biography
Koljević was born to a distinguished merchant family in Banja Luka, then part of the Kingdom of Yugoslavia, (now Bosnia and Herzegovina). His elder brother, Svetozar (1930–2016), was a renowned scholar who has written extensively on Serbian epic poetry. At the first multi-party elections held in 1990, he was elected as a Serb member of the Presidency of Bosnia and Herzegovina. In April 1992 he left the Presidency, and during the Bosnian War occupied the post of a Vice-president of Republika Srpska. He received the highest-ranking ordain of Republika Srpska. Koljević was the sole person to sign the declaration on behalf of Republika Srpska approving the Constitution of Bosnia and Herzegovina as set out in Annex 4 to the General Framework Agreement.

Koljević's son was killed in a skiing accident in 1975.

Suicide
On 16 January 1997, he tried to commit suicide by shooting himself in the head, and died a week later in a Belgrade hospital.

International Criminal Tribunal for the former Yugoslavia
In the 2016 verdict against Radovan Karadžić, the U.N.-backed International Criminal Tribunal for the former Yugoslavia (ICTY) identified Koljević as part of a Joint criminal enterprise, which included Karadžić. It described that Koljević was "particularly extreme in his view" and advocated for the expulsion of Bosnian Muslims in order to create homogeneity of territories, and said that it was "impossible for Serbs to live with anyone else":

Having taught Shakespeare for many years at the University of Sarajevo, his later involvement in Serbian nationalist politics had taken aback his former Muslim students, with many of whom he had remained good friends after graduating, because he had never before shown the slightest trace of prejudice.

Works
 Teorijski osnovi nove kritike, 1967
 O uporednom i sporednom, 1977
 Ikonoborci i ikonobranitelji, 1978
 Šekspir, tragičar, 1981
 Pesnik iza pesme, 1984
 "Tajna" poznog Dučića: interpretacija, 1985
 "Lamnet nad Beogradom" Miloša Crnjanskog, 1986
 Klasici srpskog pesništva, 1987
 Otadžbinske teme, 1995
 Andrićevo remek-delo, 1995
 Od Platona do Dejtona: (zapisi o državi našim povodom), 1996

References

Bibliography

1936 births
1997 suicides
People from Banja Luka
Serbs of Bosnia and Herzegovina
Vice presidents of Republika Srpska
Politicians of the Bosnian War
Members of the Presidency of Bosnia and Herzegovina
Shakespearean scholars
Suicides by firearm in Bosnia and Herzegovina
Serbian male essayists
Serbian nationalists
Serbian politicians who committed suicide